was a railway station located in Fujimotomachi (藤本町), Kenbuchi-chō, Kamikawa-gun, Hokkaidō. It is operated by the Hokkaido Railway Company. The station was closed on 13 March 2021

Lines served
JR Hokkaidō
Sōya Main Line

Adjacent stations

External links
Ekikara Time Table - JR Kita-Kenbuchi Station (Japanese)

Railway stations in Hokkaido Prefecture
Railway stations in Japan opened in 1987
Railway stations closed in 2021